Miniature Dinosaurs were a pop/rock band from Stirling, Scotland. The band consisted of Barry Maclean (Vocals/Guitar), Alban Dickson (Bass Guitar), Andrew McAllister (Guitar/Synth) and Sam Waller (Drums). Critics compared their music to the likes of The Killers, Pulp and Weezer.

History 
In March 2009 their track '(I Want To Watch) Top Gear' was featured on BBC Radio 1, meaning the band made it to national airwaves 3 months before the outfit performed their first gig.

In 2010 the band announced a clothing endorsement with Police-883, the first endorsement of its kind by the fashion company.  In the same year the band appeared several times in the MTV drama Being Victor.

Their 2011 single Fight or Flight was picked up by Electric Honey (label) who released it as a 7" Vinyl.  Electric Honey is most famous for helping out Biffy Clyro, Snow Patrol and Belle & Sebastian in their early years.

2012 saw the band nominated for Best Live Act at the Scottish Alternative Music Awards and then signing to UK independent label Integrity Records.

Between 2012 and 2014 the band were working on their debut album at Beetroot Studios in Airdrie.  In 2014, with no explanation, the band broke up and their album, In The Spirit of Everything, was posthumously released as a digital download.

Releases

Albums

EPs

References

Scottish rock music groups
Scottish pop music groups